The Union Automobile Company was an automobile factory to manufacture the  Union automobile through the Buckeye Manufacturing Company. It began manufacturing automobiles in 1902 and produced them through 1905. The company was located in Union City, Indiana. The inventor of Union automobile gasoline engine and friction drive gearless transmission was John W. Lambert. In the early part of 1905 the company moved to Anderson, Indiana. It had produced 325 automobiles before going out of business in the later part of 1905. It was replaced with a redesigned model that became the Lambert automobile.

History
The history of the company has its roots from the development of a self-propelled three-wheeled Buckeye gasoline buggy invented by John W. Lambert in 1891. This was considered by automobile historian and Automobile Quarterly editor L. Scott Bailey to be America's first gasoline internal combustion engine automobile. Lambert attempted to sell this automobile to the public but was unsuccessful. He was inspired to continue the development of a saleable automobile by the Chicago Times-Herald automobile race of 1895. By 1898 he had developed an experimental four-wheeled self-propelled horseless carriage powered by a Buckeye Manufacturing Company modified stationary gasoline engine built by their engine manufacturing division.

This powered vehicle brought about the establishment of the Union Automobile Company by 1901. The main body parts and gasoline engines were made by the Buckeye Manufacturing Company in Anderson, Indiana. The manufacture of the Union brand automobile for final assembly took place at Union City, Indiana. The company was located in a three story building on South Street. The automobile parts and engines were shipped from Anderson to Union City and made into the automobiles. The main factory was considered in Anderson with the subsidiary plant in Union City. The company had an advertising slogan of "In Union There is Strength", thought by automobile historian Henry Austin Clark to have been inspired by Henry Wadsworth Longfellow's 1855 poem The Song of Hiawatha.

The money pooled together for the founding of the Union Automobile Company was $50,000 . The company started constructing buildings in Union City in January 1901 for the assembly of automobiles. The vehicles were to come with Lambert's friction gearing disk drive transmission that he invented. Production started in 1902 with two styles of automobile models. One was a single seated 1,400 pound automobile equipped with a four horse power gasoline engine and another was an 1,800 pound automobile with a  seven horse power gasoline engine. The first year's models came with the motor in the front of the automobile and the next year's 1903 models came with the motor in the rear.

Models

The Union Automobile Company production started in 1902 with 10 cars a month. It manufactured in 1903 a gasoline runabout automobile with a fixed seat for two and folding seat in front for two extra passengers. The Lambert eight horsepower gasoline engine made by Buckeye Manufacturing Company was a four cycle two cylinder opposed horizontal with either make and break or jump spark for ignition. This model was shown at the Cleveland Auto Show in February 1903 and priced at $1,250 .

The company in 1904 through 1905 made a five-seater tonneau model. This automobile came with a ten horsepower engine in 1904. In 1905 it was available in a  model or a  model. In 1905 the majority of the manufacturing production was moved to the Anderson plant. That plant had always made the engines and transmissions for the Union automobile from the start. In that later part of the year the name of the automobile changed from the Union automobile to the Lambert automobile. The Union Automobile Company had made 325  "Union" automobile vehicles all total from 1902 to 1905 (25 in 1902, 50 in 1903, 100 in 1904, 150 in 1905) before they stopped production altogether of that brand. The redesigned automobile became a new vehicle called the Lambert.

See also
 John William Lambert
 Lambert Automobile Company

Notes

Sources

Further reading 

 Bailey, L. Scott, Historic Discovery: 1891 Lambert, New Claim for America's First Car, Antique Automobile magazine, Vol. 24, No. 5, Oct–Nov 1960
 Biography of John W. Lambert, written by his son January 25, 1935 — obtained from the Detroit Public Library, National Automotive History Collection
 David Burgess Wise, The New Illustrated Encyclopedia of Automobiles 
 Dittlinger, Esther et al., Anderson: A Pictorial History, G. Bradley Publishing, 1990, 
 Dolnar, Hugh, Automobile Trade Journal, article: The Lambert, 1906 Line of Automobiles, Chilton Company, v.10 January 1906
 Forkner, John L., History of Madison County, Indiana, New York and Chicago, The Lewis Publishing Company, 1914
 The Automobile Trade Magazine, Horseless Age Company, 1902
 Huffman, Wallace Spencer, Indiana's Place in Automobile History in Indiana History Bulletin, vol 44, no. 2, Feb. 1967; Indianapolis, Indiana Historical Bureau
 Huhti, Thomas, The Great Indiana Touring Book: 20 Spectacular Auto Tours, Big Earth Publishing, 2002, 
 James, Wanda, Driving from Japan, McFarland, 2005, 

1900s cars
1910s cars
Defunct motor vehicle manufacturers of the United States
Motor vehicle manufacturers based in Indiana
Anderson, Indiana
Defunct manufacturing companies based in Indiana
1902 establishments in Indiana
1905 disestablishments in Indiana
Brass Era vehicles
Vintage vehicles